Carrigafoyle (meaning "on a rock overlooking water") is a historic building in Wellington, New Zealand.

The house was designed by Penty & Blake for Robert and Elizabeth O'Connor. Robert's Irish ancestors were said to extend back to Carrigafoyle in Ireland. Elizabeth was a daughter of the Hon John Martin, after whom Martinborough is named. The house as designed had two main floors plus a basement and sub-basement. There were seven bedrooms and various living spaces. There was a 'principal staircase' for family and guests and a smaller staircase on the opposite side of the building for servants' use. The basement held the billiard room and a museum, which was a private project of the O'Connors' son Albert Creagh O'Connor. 'Spectacular' art nouveau stained glass windows were designed by Charles Edward Carter of Robert Martin Ltd.

After Elizabeth O'Connor died in 1919 the house was put up for sale. A real estate advertisement at that time said the house had 11 bedrooms, a dining room, morning room, drawing room, lounge hall, full-size billiard room, conservatory, telephone room, dark room and two balconies with "glorious" views of the harbour. The building was restored in the 1980s by Rex Nicholls (a former city councillor). It is flanked by an art deco building bearing the same name.

The building is classified as a Category 1 ("places of 'special or outstanding historical or cultural heritage significance or value") historic place by Heritage New Zealand.

It is mentioned in the song 'Adelphi Apartments' by Tiny Ruins, New Zealand singer-songwriter Hollie Fullbrook.

References

External links

Buildings and structures in Wellington City
Heritage New Zealand Category 1 historic places in the Wellington Region
1900s architecture in New Zealand